Garra mirofrontis is a species of ray-finned fish in the genus Garra.

References 

Garra
Fish described in 1987